Corni may refer to:

Places in Romania
 Corni, Botoșani
 Corni, Galați
 Corni, a village in Cornățelu Commune, Dâmboviţa County
 Corni, a village in Bicaz Commune, Maramureș County
 Corni, a village in Bodești Commune, Neamţ County
 Corni, a district in Liteni town, Suceava County
 Cornii de Jos and Cornii de Sus, villages in Tătărăști Commune, Bacău County
 Corni, a tributary of the river Bistra in Caraș-Severin County

Other
 , the archaic Italian plural term for the French horn
 Guido Corni (1883–1946), colonial governor of Italian Somaliland

See also 
 Cornel (disambiguation)
 Cornelia (disambiguation)
 Cornu (disambiguation)
 Cornea (disambiguation)
 Cornetu (disambiguation)
 Cornățel (disambiguation)
 Cornești (disambiguation)
 Corneanu (disambiguation)